The Ethel Wilson Harris House is a house built in 1956 located in what is now the San Antonio Missions National Historical Park, outside the perimeter walls of the Mission San Jose, in San Antonio, Texas, USA.  It is a Modern Movement or Wrightian architecture style house built in 1956, designed by Robert Harris.

The house was documented in the Historic American Buildings Survey and is listed in the NRHP for its architecture.

It was a home of artist and conservationist Ethel Wilson Harris.  Harris was a supervisor of Arts & Crafts projects for the Works Progress Administration in San Antonio.  Two of her tile murals are on the San Antonio River Walk.

References

National Register of Historic Places in San Antonio
Houses on the National Register of Historic Places in Texas
Houses completed in 1956
Modern Movement architecture
Houses in San Antonio
San Antonio Missions National Historical Park